Ilindi is an administrative ward in the Dodoma Rural district of the Dodoma Region of Tanzania.

References

Wards of Dodoma Region